The 2010–11 Rugby League Conference was the 26th season of the Rugby League Conference, the top league for British amateur rugby league clubs, and was the final season that the league was played in the winter.

Premier Division
The Premier Division featured three new clubs:
Thatto Heath Crusaders, promoted as champions from 2009–10 RLC Division One
Bradford Dudley Hill, promoted from 2009–10 RLC Division One
Saddleworth Rangers, promoted from 2009–10 RLC Division One

League table

Play-offs

Division One
Division One featured six new clubs:
Eccles & Salford, promoted as champions from 2009–10 RLC Division Two
Oldham St Annes, promoted from 2009–10 RLC Division Two
Stanley Rangers, promoted from 2009–10 RLC Division Two
Ince Rose Bridge, relegated from 2009–10 RLC Premier Division
Oulton Raiders, relegated from 2009–10 RLC Premier Division
Widnes St Maries, relegated from 2009–10 RLC Premier Division

Widnes St Maries resigned from the league mid-season; their record was expunged.

League table

Division Two
Division Two featured four new clubs:
 Heworth, relegated from 2009–10 RLC Division One
 West Bowling, relegated from 2009–10 RLC Division One
 Hunslet Warriors, elected into league
 Elland, elected into league

West Bowling were forced to withdraw at the end of the season due to the league being switched to a summer competition and their pitch not being available during the cricket season.

League table

2011 transitional season
Between August 2011 and November 2011, a short transitional season was played in preparation for the switch to a summer competition in 2012. Two new teams, Askam and Widnes West Bank, joined the competition, increasing the number of teams to 40. The league was split into eight groups of five teams based in geographical location (due to the subsequent withdrawal of West Bowling, Group G only consisted of four teams). The play-offs were contested by the eight group winners. The league champions were Hunslet Warriors, who defeated Wigan St Patricks 18–14 in the play-off final after extra time.

Group A

Group B

Group C

Group D

Group E

Group F

Group G

Group H

Play-offs

References 

National Conference League seasons
National Conference League